Farrer Park Constituency was a constituency in Singapore. It used to exist from 1955 to 1980.

Member of Parliament

Elections

Historical maps

References

External links
1976 Parliamentary General Election result
1972 Parliamentary General Election result
1968 Parliamentary General Election result
1963 Legislative Assembly General Election result
1959 Legislative Assembly General Election result
1955 Legislative Assembly General Election result

Singaporean electoral divisions